Cromags may refer to:

 Cro-Mags, a hardcore punk band from New York City
 Kromaggs, a species of humanoid primates from the science fiction television show Sliders

See also
 Cro-Magnon (disambiguation)